Heinrich (Henry) Teuscher (May 8, 1891 in Berlin – August 9, 1984, in Toronto) was a landscape architect, horticulturalist and botanist best known for having designed the Jardin Botanique de Montreal. He was also its first curator.

Professional recognition 
Teuscher won the 1953 AHS Professional Award from the American Horticultural Society, as well as the 1962 Liberty Hyde Bailey Award, and the American Public Gardens Association's 1978 Award for Merit. The genus of orchids Teuscheria is named for him.

References 

1891 births
1984 deaths
German landscape architects
Canadian landscape architects
20th-century German botanists
Recipients of the Iron Cross (1914)
20th-century Canadian botanists
German emigrants to Canada